Đặng Amaobi (born as Amaobi Honest Uzowuru, born 19 September 1981) is a former footballer. Born in Nigeria, he obtained Vietnamese citizenship through naturalisation.

References

Association football forwards
Living people
Nigerian footballers
1981 births
Becamex Binh Duong FC players
V.League 1 players
Thanh Hóa FC players
SHB Da Nang FC players
Sportspeople from Warri